Romane Prigent (born 1 April 1999) is a French slalom canoeist who has competed at the international level since 2016. She is from Pau in the Pyrénées-Atlantiques department of France and competes for Pau Canoe-kayak Club Universitaire.

She won a gold medal in the K1 team event at the 2022 European Canoe Slalom Championships in Liptovský Mikuláš. She has also won six medals at the Junior and U23 World Championships, with 2 U23 titles in K1 team (2019, 2021), an U23 silver in K1 (2021), 2 junior silver medals in K1 team (2016, 2017) and an U23 bronze in K1 team (2022). Prigent won the first World Cup round in 2020 in Tacen, after training alone due to the COVID-19 pandemic, an achievement which provided her with self-belief.

Her cousin Camille Prigent is also a professional slalom canoeist, and Romane's training partner. Her uncle Jean-Yves and cousin Yves are former slalom canoeists, and World Champions in K1 team and Mixed C2, respectively.

Results

World Cup individual podiums

Complete World Cup results

Notes
No overall rankings were determined by the ICF, with only two races possible due to the COVID-19 pandemic.

References

External links

 

Living people
French female canoeists
1999 births
Sportspeople from Pau, Pyrénées-Atlantiques
20th-century French women
21st-century French women